Tegenaria regispyrrhi is a funnel-web spider native to Bulgaria, Greece and the Balkans.

See also 
 List of Agelenidae species

References

External links 

regispyrrhi
Spiders of Europe
Fauna of the Balkans
Spiders described in 1976